Tiger was the third of six Type 24 torpedo boats built for the German Navy (initially called the Reichsmarine and then renamed as the Kriegsmarine in 1935) during the 1920s. The boat made multiple non-intervention patrols during the Spanish Civil War in the late 1930s. Tiger was sunk by a German destroyer in August 1939 which accidentally rammed her during night training.

Design and armament
Derived from the preceding Type 23 torpedo boat, the Type 24 was slightly larger and faster, but had a similar armament. Their crew numbered 129 officers and sailors.

As built, the Type 24s mounted three  SK C/28 guns, one forward and two aft of the superstructure, numbered one through three from bow to stern. They carried six above-water 50 cm (19.7 in) torpedo tubes in two triple mounts amidships and could also carry up to 30 mines. After 1931, the torpedo tubes were replaced by  tubes and a pair of  C/30 anti-aircraft guns were added.

Construction and career

Tiger was laid down at the Reichsmarinewerft Wilhelmshaven (Navy Yard) on 2 April 1927 as yard number 112, launched on 15 March 1928 and commissioned on 15 January 1929. The boat was initially assigned to the 3rd Torpedo Boat Half-Flotilla and by the end of 1936 she was assigned to the 2nd Torpedo Boat Flotilla. She made several deployments to Spain during the Spanish Civil War. Around June 1938, Tiger was transferred to the 3rd Torpedo Boat Flotilla which was renumbered the 6th Flotilla on 1 July.

Shortly before the German declaration of war on Poland on 1 September 1939, many of the Kriegsmarines torpedo boats and destroyers were training in the Baltic Sea. At 02:34 on 27 August, the destroyer  accidentally rammed the darkened Tiger, which sank at 03:13 with two men dead and six wounded. The survivors were rescued by the destroyer, which had her bow damaged, but suffered no casualties of her own.

Notes

Citations

References
 

 

Type 24 torpedo boats
1928 ships
Ships built in Wilhelmshaven